Vance Loren McHenry (10 July 1956) is a former Major League Baseball shortstop for the Seattle Mariners.

Sources

Baseball Gauge
Retrosheet
Venezuelan Professional Baseball League

Baseball players from California
Butte Roadrunners baseball players
Hawaii Islanders players
Jackson Mets players
Leones del Caracas players
American expatriate baseball players in Venezuela
Lynn Sailors players
Major League Baseball shortstops
Nashua Pirates players
Oklahoma City 89ers players
Salt Lake City Gulls players
San Jose Missions players
Seattle Mariners players
Spokane Indians players
Stockton Mariners players
Syracuse Chiefs players
UNLV Rebels baseball players
1956 births
Living people
Sportspeople from Chico, California